Nicolaia Anna Rips (b. August 19, 1998) is an American author. She is the author of Trying to Float, a memoir about her childhood in New York's Chelsea Hotel. Born in New York City, Nicolaia is the daughter of Michael Rips (a writer and lawyer) and Sheila Berger (an artist and former model). Rips attended LaGuardia High School for Music and the Performing Arts and specialized in vocal music. She currently attends Brown University. Her writing deals with coming of age as an outsider and has received praise for its humor and self-deprecation.

References 

1998 births
Living people
Brown University alumni
Fiorello H. LaGuardia High School alumni
21st-century American women writers